When writing the Aeneid, Virgil drew from his studies on the Homeric epics of the Iliad to help him create a national epic poem for the Roman people. Virgil used several characteristics associated with epic poetry, more specifically Homer's epics, including the use of hexameter verse, book division, lists of genealogies and underlying themes to draw parallels between the Romans and their cultural predecessors, the Greeks.

Similarities to the Iliad

The second half of the Aeneid, Books VI through XII, follow similarly to what happens throughout the Iliad.

Heroes 
Book VI of the Aeneid reveals a prophecy for Aeneas by the Sibyl of Cumae stating that a Latin-born Achilles, who is also the son of a goddess, exists (Aeneid, Book VI, lines 89–90). This Latin-born Achilles is never explicitly mentioned. In the Aeneid there are allusions to both Aeneas and Turnus fulfilling the Latin-born Achilles prophecy. The death of Pallas sparks an element of furor in Aeneas, as does the death of Patroclus inspires furor in Achilles. The theme of furor is a common characteristic as it gives the heroes reasons to fight and avenge.

Prophecies

Prophecies contribute a large theme among epics, especially that of the Iliad, the Odyssey and the Aeneid. From the beginning of the Iliad, readers knew that the Greeks were fated to triumph over the Trojans, as was declared by the king of the gods, Zeus. and the Odyssey Achilles' fate was also foretold; if he went to war he would die a hero. Similarly, Aeneas was told by the ghost of Hector in Book II that he was to leave burning Troy to found a new city. Throughout the rest of the epic, the gods include reminders that Aeneas is destined to find Italy and found Rome for future generations.

Ekphrasis

Another thing Virgil replicates from the Iliad is the ekphrasis of Aeneas' shield. In Book VIII of the Aeneid, Vulcan (the Roman equivalent of the Greek god Hephaestus) forges a shield for Aeneas before he goes into battle. This is similar to Hephaestus creating Achilles' shield in Book XVII of the Iliad. Both of the goddesses who mothered the heroes (Venus and Thetis) feared for the safety of their sons preceding war, so both went to Vulcan/Hephaestus asking for him to create armor and a shield for Aeneas and Achilles. Upon the finish of the god of fire's creations, the poets soon followed with a detailed description of the shields, an ekphrasis. The ekphrasis of the shield of Achilles depicts everything that the world currently consisted of, as well as opposites, such as war and peace, heaven and earth, etc.  The ekphrasis of Aeneas' shield depicts Rome's greatest glories that are to come, such as the founder of Rome, Romulus, with his twin brother Remus with the she-wolf that cared for the twins, and Augustus' victory at the Battle of Actium.

Similarities to the Odyssey

The first half of the Aeneid mimics the journey of Odysseus in several ways. Though the Odyssey takes course over the span of 24 books while the Aeneid replicates the happenings in the Odyssey in 6 books, there are several comparisons to make.

The characters

Odysseus and Aeneas are both royalty, Odysseus being the king of Ithaca and Aeneas a Trojan prince. Without the help of divine intervention though, neither hero would have met his destiny, though there were opposing gods who wanted to delay and provide hardship for the heroes along the journey. Odysseus’ antagonist was Poseidon, the god of the sea, whom he angered by blinding Poseidon's son Polyphemus. In doing this, Poseidon's wrath was given every chance possible, especially with storms blowing the Greek ships off course, even destroying them. Hera was the goddess who used everything in her power to delay Aeneas from ever fulfilling his prophecy since Aeneas was a Trojan, and Hera had a hatred for the Trojans ever since the Trojan prince Paris gave a golden apple to Aphrodite, stating that she was the most beautiful out of the two goddesses: Athena and Hera. Storms caused by Hera also blow the Trojan fleet about and off course, which ultimately lands them at Carthage (leading to another reason for Hera to despise Aeneas and the Trojans).

Stories within a story

The concept of a character narrating a story within the current story, providing subsequent layers, is seen in both the Aeneid and the Odyssey, more specifically the story of the heroes' journey up until that point in time, since both epics start in medias res, in the middle of things. With the story of Odysseus, the Greek washes up on the shores of Scheria, the land of the Phaeacians, who hospitably take Odysseus in and ask him how he has come to their land. Odysseus spends Books IX through XII recounting his journey from Troy to where he was presently. In Aeneas' case, upon arrival in Carthage, Dido asked Aeneas to share his story, so Books II and III were narrating the fall of Troy and how Aeneas and his people arrived at Carthage.

The journey

Both heroes sail over the same sea, sometimes visiting the same locations and experiencing the same difficulties. In Book III of the Aeneid, Aeneas and his men come close to Scylla and Charybdis, as Odysseus and his men do in Book XII of the Odyssey, followed by the Trojans landing on the island of the Cyclopes, as Aeneas does in Book III. Aeneas' crew had the fortune of not having the same fate as some in Odysseus' crew. Virgil also included an emaciated Greek named Achaemenides, who had sailed with Odysseus but had been left behind. The two heroes also make a katabasis into the Underworld to retrieve information from the deceased.

The homecoming
Upon arrival in Ithaca, Odysseus is met with suitors who are in his home, destroying it, and trying to win the hand of his wife, Penelope. Odysseus proceeds to fight off these suitors, killing them so he can have his home back. Similarly, Aeneas is supposed to found his home in Latium and marry the princess Lavinia, where he is met with the army of Turnus, who was the king of Rutuli and Lavinia's leading suitor before Aeneas came along. Aeneas has to engage in a battle before he can finally rest in his newfound home.

References

 
Homer
Greece in fiction
Italy in fiction
References in literary works
References to literary works